Kazlų Rūda is a city in Lithuania. The city is surrounded by forests, but a railway line crosses the city and divides it into almost equal parts. Inter IKEA Holding operates a manufacturing plant in the city..

Sport
 FK Šilas Kazlų Rūda football club;
 FK Kazlų Rūda football club;
 Kazlų Rūdos miesto stadionas (Stadium of Kazlų Rūda);
 Sports center of Kazlų Rūda;

Twin towns – sister cities
Kazlų Rūda is twinned with six cities:
 Frombork, Poland
 Sondershausen, Germany
 Lwówek, Poland
 Koriukivka, Ukraine
 Olecko, Poland
 Gołdap, Poland

References

External links
Official website

 
Municipalities administrative centres of Lithuania
Cities in Lithuania
Cities in Marijampolė County